Mitchell is a former town in Eagle County, Colorado, United States. The GNIS classifies it as a populated place.

History
A post office called Mitchell was established in 1883, and remained in operation until 1909. The community was named for George R. Mitchell, a settler.

See also

References

External links

Unincorporated communities in Eagle County, Colorado
Unincorporated communities in Colorado